Connacht Rugby and Leinster Rugby are two Irish rugby union provincial teams that possess a rivalry that dates back to their IRFU Interprovincial Championship clashes during the amateur era. That rivalry has continued and even intensified since the emergence of the professional era in the late 1990s. Connacht and Leinster comprise two of the four Irish provincial teams competing in the Pro14 (formerly known as the Celtic League). As such, the two sides regularly face each other during the regular season, and occasionally during the knock-out rounds.

The rivalry has been heightened on several occasions due to certain games or events. Connacht and Leinster met in the 2016 Pro12 Grand Final, with Connacht winning 20–10, to claim their first Pro12 championship. Leinster has observed that the rivalry leads Connacht to raise their game when playing Leinster, leading to resentment among Leinster players when this causes them to lose matches they had expected to win.
Connacht defeated Leinster 47–10 in 2017, and were so comfortable in their victory that they had a forward kick a conversion. Connacht and Leinster players have recognized the rivalry that exists between the two teams.

Below are the historical results of the Irish Rugby Football Union teams, Leinster and Connacht, as part of the IRFU Interprovincial Championship, and later the Celtic League, Pro12 and Pro14.

Overall Summary of Games Since 1946

Statistics

Highest scoring match

2021–22: 76 points (Leinster 56 Connacht 20) 

Lowest scoring match

1960–61: Leinster 0 Connacht 0

Highest margin of victory

Leinster: 47 points (54–7 at home in 2019–20)

Connacht: 37 points (47–10 at home in 2017–18)

Most consecutive wins

Leinster: 20 (1965–1985)

Connacht: 2 (2015–2016)

Results between 1946 and 1995

Results since 1995/96 season

See also
 History of rugby union matches between Connacht and Ulster
 History of rugby union matches between Leinster and Munster
 History of rugby union matches between Leinster and Ulster
 History of rugby union matches between Munster and Connacht
 History of rugby union matches between Munster and Ulster
 IRFU Interprovincial Championship

References

Leinster
Connacht
Rugby union rivalries in Ireland
United Rugby Championship